Hedon railway station is a disused railway station on the North Eastern Railway's Hull and Holderness Railway on the northern edge of Hedon in the East Riding of Yorkshire, England. It was opened by the Hull and Holderness Railway on 27 June 1854. The station was closed to passengers on 19 October 1964 and to freight on 3 June 1968.

The goods shed was a west facing structure that was to the north of the station. It was built outside of the Borough of Hedon due to a clause in the town's charter of 1170 which allowed the inhabitants to charge for goods unloaded in the boundaries of the town. Although this was written for shipping entering the town via Hedon Haven, the Hull and Holderness railway were unwilling to pay the dues, so they located the goods shed in the parish of Preston.

References

 

Disused railway stations in the East Riding of Yorkshire
Railway stations in Great Britain opened in 1854
Railway stations in Great Britain closed in 1964
Former North Eastern Railway (UK) stations
Beeching closures in England
Hull and Holderness Railway
Hedon